Stephen VIII Báthory (1477–1534) was a Hungarian noble.

He was a son of Nicholas Báthory (1462–1500) of the Somlyó branch of the Báthory family, and of Sophia Bánffy de Losoncz.

He was appointed in 1521 adjoin (deputy) of the Voivode of Transylvania, and served under the Voivode John Zápolya. After the Battle of Mohács in 1526, Stephen supported Zápolya's claim to the Kingship of Hungary and in 1529 was made Voivode of Transylvania.

He fathered eight children with his wife Catherine Telegdi. 
Nicholas
Catharine
Andrew, father of Stephen, Balthasar and Andrew Báthory
Sophia
Anna (? –1570), born after her father's death, the mother of Elizabeth Báthory.
Elizabeth (? –1562), who apparently was born well after her father's death
Christopher (1530–1581), who governed Transylvania in the absence of his younger brother Stefan.
Stephen (1533–1586), who became Voivode (and later Prince) of Transylvania and King of Poland.

Literature
Farin, Michael, Heroine des Grauens. Elisabeth Báthory. Munich: P. Kirchheim, 2003. .
Wertner, Moritz, "Urgeschlechter in Siebenbürgen.", in Archiv des Vereins für siebenbürgische Landeskunde. Neue Folge, Bd. 29, Heft 1 (1899), Hermannstadt 1899, p. 156–235.

Voivodes of Transylvania
Stephen 08
1477 births
1534 deaths
16th-century Hungarian people